Colonel  Edith Nakalema, is a Ugandan military officer, who graduated in August 2018 from the Higher Command and Staff Course at the Joint Services Command and Staff College, in Watchfield, Oxfordshire, United Kingdom, where she had been admitted in 2017.

Background and education
She was born in Kashaari Village, Mbarara District in the Western Region of Uganda, to Midrace Sserwadda, a housewife and Eriyasafu Sserwadda, an Anglican parish priest. She joined the Uganda People's Defence Force (UPDF) in 1999, where she rose to the rank of Major, in the "Special Forces Command", under the command of Muhoozi Kainerugaba.

Nakalema holds a Diploma in Business Studies, awarded by Makerere University Business School. She also holds a Bachelor’s Degree in Procurement and Logistics Management, obtained from Nkumba University.

Career
Prior to her arrival at the Uganda State House, Nakalema had worked in the finance department of the Special Forces Command (SFC). She was part of a team that established a working financial and accounting system at the SFC. In 2014, she was appointed to be the personal private secretary (PPS) to the president of Uganda, on the recommendation of the SFC. In November 2016, her role was elevated to that of personal assistant to the president, specifically taking charge of the president's daily itinerary. She was replaced as PPS, by Molly Kamukama, a civilian.

In June 2017, Nakalema was selected to attend senior military training in the United Kingdom.

Other considerations
In November 2017, the New Vision newspaper in Kampala, Uganda reported that Major Edith Nakalema was a student at the Joint Services Command and Staff College (JSCSC), in the United Kingdom. As part of the international day celebrations by students at the military college, Nakalema showcased Ugandan attire, cuisine (including food and fruits) and cultural dances. The showcase, attended by staff from Uganda's high commission in London, impressed Air Vice Marshal Chris Luck, the commander of the military school.

To celebrate her graduation from the Joint Services and Command Staff College at the United Kingdom Defence Academy in Shrivenham, Major Nakalema  hosted her classmates, instructors, other college staff and their families to a luncheon, attended by over 100 people from 15 different countries.

Promotion and re-assignment
In December 2018, Nakalema was introduced at a public function as a Lieutenant Colonel, who is the head of the State House Anti-Corruption Unit (SH-ACU), based at State House, in Kampala.

In April 2021, the Commander-in-Chief of the UPDF promoted a total of 1,393 military officers. Among those promoted was Edith Nakalema, who was promoted from Lieutenant Colonel to full Colonel.

In January 2022, Nakalema was selected to be part of the pioneer class at the newly established National Defence College, Uganda. She was replaced at SH-ACU by Brigadier Henry Isoke, who previously served as second-in-command at Chieftaincy of Military Intelligence, deputizing Major General Abel Kandiho.

Family
Colonel Edith Nakalema is a married mother.

See also
 Proscovia Nalweyiso
 Annette Nkalubo
 Christine Nyangoma
 Rebecca Mpagi
 Flavia Byekwaso

References

External links
Website of State House Uganda
How Nakalema-led SH-ACU has contributed in amplifying the war against corruption As of 12 November 2021.
 Congs Major Edith Nakalema! From HTP Family As of 5 August 2018.

Ganda people
Ugandan military personnel
Uganda People's Defence Force
People from Western Region, Uganda
Graduates of Joint Services Command and Staff College
1978 births
Living people
People from Mbarara District
Makerere University alumni
Nkumba University alumni